Anthony Fabian is a British producer, writer and director of feature films, shorts, documentaries, and classical music programmes made through his company, Elysian Films. He is the director of Mrs. Harris Goes to Paris starring Lesley Manville and Isabelle Huppert, released in the US by Focus Features in July 2022 and by Universal Pictures in the rest of the world later in the year. His first feature film, Skin, won 22 international awards. His feature-documentary, Good Hope, about the past, present and potential future of South Africa, was released in 2020. He has also worked as music supervisor on a number of feature films, including Restoration, GoldenEye, Schubert and Hilary and Jackie.

Career
2020 saw the release of Fabian's feature-length documentary "Good Hope", exploring the current socio-political landscape of South Africa through the eyes of the post-apartheid generation.  His next feature film, based on Paul Gallico's Mrs. Harris Goes to Paris, went into production in October 2020 and was released by Focus Features in 2022. It stars Lesley Manville, Isabelle Huppert, Jason Isaacs, Lambert Wilson, Anna Chancellor, Lucas Bravo, Alba Baptista, Ellen Thomas and Rose Williams. Fabian, together with Keith Thompson, Carroll Cartwright, and Olivia Hetreed, won best feature adaption for their work on Mrs. Harris Goes to Paris at the AWGIE Awards 2022.

Personal life
Fabian grew up in Mexico City, Paris, Los Angeles and the UK, before settling in London. Fabian was the civil partner of Christopher Hogwood until shortly before Hogwood died in 2014. He is of Hungarian origin on his mother's side and also holds Hungarian citizenship.

Filmography

Films

Documentaries

References

External links
 
 Anthony Fabian biography at the Elysian Films website

Year of birth missing (living people)
Living people
Film producers from California
British film directors
British film producers
LGBT film directors
British LGBT screenwriters